George Lopez (born October 23, 1966), known by his stage name DJ Keoki or Keoki Franconi, is a Salvadoran-American electronic musician and DJ. Born in El Salvador and raised in Hawaii, Keoki began advertising himself as "superstar" shortly after moving to New York City.

Biography
Keoki Franconi was born in El Salvador but moved to Kihei, Maui, when he was 8.  After graduating from Kailua High School he moved to the mainland to study at an airline school in California. Franconi then enjoyed a brief career with several airline operations in New York City, among them the now defunct Trans World Airlines, while also being a busboy at the city's trendy Danceteria club.  It was at Danceteria that he got his start:

Club Kids and Michael Alig

While in New York City, he met and began a romance with Michael Alig. Alig rose to international notability as the head of the Club Kids, a group of diverse partygoers who would dress in costumes each night and form parties in New York and across the United States.

Dance music writer Jennifer Warner remembers,

While DJing at "Disco 2000", Alig's party night at the Limelight, Franconi was alleged to have passed out on the turntables while performing a set. He has completely denied the allegation, supposedly having stated: "I guarantee you that never fucking happened".

Superstar
Franconi had a successful career during the late 1990s and early 2000s as Superstar DJ Keoki; he released a number of CDs over that decade and was hired to play for thousands of people at massive raves. In 2006 and 2007, he toured in the United States and Europe on the Club Party Monster Tour, a tribute to the film Party Monster (2003) as well as a nod to the Club Kid scene that shot him into stardom.  During the tour, he was known for dressing extravagantly, wearing makeup, and sporting a number of tattoos.

Keoki still tours and performs at venues such as The Viper Room in Los Angeles, California, Shag in Denver, Colorado, Club Tantra in Tampa, Florida (permanently closed as of September 14, 2020), VIA Afterhours in Houston, Texas, Amazura Concert Hall in Queens, New York, Hard Rock Cafe in Fort Lauderdale, Florida, and Level II [this venue does not exist] in Scranton, Pennsylvania. He also makes annual appearances in Moscow at the Gaudi Fest during Halloween, and has played at the Love Parade in Berlin, Germany. In January 2017, he was arrested in New York City after a man in his apartment died of a drug overdose, when the officers entering his apartment found it contained illegal narcotics. Following the incident, he entered a rehabilitation program and announced the cancellation of all of his upcoming events.

Discography 
1991 – DJ Keoki Presents Disco 2000 – Volume One (12")
1991 – DJ Keoki Presents Disco 2000 – Volume Two (12")
1993 – We Are One
1994 – Journeys By DJ
1995 – All Mixed Up
1996 – Disco Death Race 2000
1996 – The Transatlantic Move
1997 – Ego Trip
1998 – Inevitable Alien Nation
1998 – Altered Ego Trip (The Remix Album)
2000 – djmixed.com/keoki
2001 – Jealousy (also released in a Limited Edition 2XCD version with bonus CD w/ exclusive remixes)
2002 – Keokiclash
2002 – Misdirected Jealousy: The Remix Album
2003 – Kill The DJ
2004 – The Great Soundclash Swindle
2010 – Talking to Yourself
2019 – Born to Attack

Depictions in popular media
He is written about in James St. James' book, Disco Bloodbath:
He is portrayed by Wilmer Valderrama in Party Monster (2003), a biopic about James St. James and Michael Alig
He was interviewed in Better Living Through Circuitry (1999), a documentary about electronic dance music culture
His song "Caterpillar" was featured in The Simpsons episode "Raging Abe Simpson and His Grumbling Grandson in 'The Curse of the Flying Hellfish'

See also
 LGBT culture in New York City
 List of LGBT people from New York City

References

External links 
Superstar DJ Keoki on Myspace

AllMusic - Biography
patreon.com/keoki

1966 births
Salvadoran emigrants to the United States
Club DJs
Club Kids
LGBT DJs
LGBT Hispanic and Latino American people
American dance musicians
Salvadoran LGBT people
American gay musicians
Living people
Musicians from Hawaii
Hypnotic Records artists
20th-century LGBT people
21st-century LGBT people